Keyes is a common surname, derived from either Anglo-Saxon tribe of Great Britain or a Celtic tribe of Ireland. Notable people with the name include:

 Alan Keyes (born 1950), American politician and diplomat
 Ancel Keyes, American scientist who invented K-rations and popularized the Mediterranean diet
 Baron Keyes, a title in the Peerage of the United Kingdom
 Charles Henry Keyes (1858–1925), American educator
 Charles Reuben Keyes (1871–1951), American archaeologist
 Charles Rollin Keyes (1864–1942), American geologist, ornithologist, and politician 
 Christian Keyes (born 1975), American actor and model
 Daniel Keyes (1927–2014), American author
 Dan Keyes, American musician in the band Recover
 Edward J. Keyes (1859–1929), American politician and farmer
 Erasmus D. Keyes (1810–1895), American general
 Evelyn Keyes (1916–2008), American actress
 Frances Parkinson Keyes (1885–1970), American author
 Geoffrey Charles Tasker Keyes VC (1917–1941), British Major killed in the raid on Rommel
 Geoffrey Keyes (1888–1967), major general in the U.S. Army during World War II
 George Keyes (1919–2010), American professional golfer
 Gregory Keyes (born 1963), science fiction and fantasy writer
 Henry Keyes (1810–1870), American politician and railroad executive
 Henry W. Keyes (1863–1938), politician
 Homer Eaton Keyes (1875–1938), Dartmouth professor
 Hugh T. Keyes (1888–1963), American architect
 Israel Keyes (1978–2012), American serial killer
 James W. Keyes, American chief executive, formerly of 7-Eleven and Blockbuster Inc.
 Jocelyn Marcel Keyes (born 1950), American political activist 
 Joe Keyes (musician) (1907–1950), American jazz trumpeter
 Johnnie Keyes (1940–2018), early African-American pornographic film actor
Josh Keyes (born 1969), American painter and printmaker
 Ken Keyes (politician) (born 1930), Ontario politician
 Ken Keyes Jr. (1921–1995), author and lecturer
 Laurel Elizabeth Keyes (1907-1983), counselor
 Marcus Keyes (born 1973), American football player
 Marian Keyes (born 1963), Irish writer
 Maya Keyes (born 1985), daughter of American politician and diplomat Alan Keyes
 Michael Keyes (1886–1959), Irish politician
 Perley Keyes (1774–1834), New York politician
 Ralph Keyes (born 1961), rugby player
 Ralph Keyes (author) (born 1945)
 Sir Robert Keyes (1190-1221), 1216, Knights Templar who fought in the fifth crusade
 Roger Keyes, 1st Baron Keyes (1872–1945), British admiral and hero
 Roswell K. Colcord (1839–1939), Governor of Nevada from 1891 to 1895
 Sidney Keyes (1922–1943), English poet and soldier during World War II
 Stan Keyes (born 1953), Canadian politician
 BoPete Keyes (born 1997), American football player
 Thomas Keyes (1523–1571), Royal gatekeeper to Queen Elizabeth I of England
 Wade Keyes (1821–1879), Confederate politician

See also
 Kay (surname)
 Key (surname)
 Keys (surname)

English-language surnames